At the 1920 Summer Olympics in Antwerp, ten swimming events were contested. The women's 300 metre freestyle event was new since the previous Games in 1912. The competitions were held from Sunday August 22, 1920, to Sunday August 29, 1920. There was a total of 116 participants from 19 countries competing.

Medal table

Medal summary

Men's events

Women's events

Participating nations
A total of 116 swimmers (92 men and 24 women) from 19 nations (men from 17 nations - women from 9 nations) competed at the Antwerp Games:

  (men:5 women:1)
  (men:11 women:1)
  (men:2 women:0)
  (men:3 women:0)
  (men:4 women:0)
  (men:1 women:0)
  (men:10 women:3)
  (men:12 women:6)
  (men:4 women:0)
  (men:2 women:0)
  (men:2 women:0)
  (men:3 women:1)
  (men:0 women:1)
  (men:2 women:0)
  (men:0 women:1)
  (men:2 women:0)
  (men:9 women:4)
  (men:4 women:0)
  (men:16 women:6)

References

 
 
 

 
1920
1920 Summer Olympics events
1920 in swimming